Layo may refer to:

 Layo Paskin, British DJ in Layo & Bushwacka!, active 1988–present
 Layo District, in Peru
 Layo, Cusco, a village in Layo District, Peru
 Lake Langui Layo